APJ may refer to:

 The Astrophysical Journal
 Apelin receptor
 Absolute probability judgement
 Asia-Pacific
 APJ Abdul Kalam (1931 - 2015), former President of India
 Peach Aviation ICAO Airlines Code